The 1982 North Indian Ocean cyclone season was part of the annual cycle of tropical cyclone formation. The season has no official bounds but cyclones tend to form between April and December. These dates conventionally delimit the period of each year when most tropical cyclones form in the northern Indian Ocean. There are two main seas in the North Indian Ocean—the Bay of Bengal to the east of the Indian subcontinent and the Arabian Sea to the west of India. The official Regional Specialized Meteorological Centre in this basin is the India Meteorological Department (IMD), while the Joint Typhoon Warning Center (JTWC) releases unofficial advisories. An average of five tropical cyclones form in the North Indian Ocean every season with peaks in May and November. Cyclones occurring between the meridians 45°E and 100°E are included in the season by the IMD.



Systems

Extremely Severe Cyclonic Storm BOB 01

On April 30 the monsoon trough spawned a tropical depression in the western Bay of Bengal. It tracked northeastward, becoming a tropical storm on the 1st and a cyclone on the 2nd. Its movement became more to the east, and the cyclone continued to quickly intensify, reaching a peak of 145 mph winds just before landfall. The small and compact cyclone hit southern Myanmar on the 4th, and it dissipated the next day over land. Moderate to heavy damage was experienced, but advance warning kept the death toll at only five.

Extremely Severe Cyclonic Storm BOB 02

Tropical Depression 2B developed from the monsoon trough in the central Bay of Bengal on May 30. It headed northeastward, becoming a tropical storm later that day and reaching a peak of 65 mph winds on the 31st. The storm turned to the northwest, where it weakened to a tropical depression. It restrengthened, and hit near Paradip, India on the 3rd as a 65 mph tropical storm. The storm brought heavy flooding amounting to 140 casualties and destroying over 500,000 homes. Whole coast of Odisha suffered major damages. Districts of Puri, Cuttack and Balasore were the worst affected among them.

LAND Depression 01

Depression ARB 01

Deep Depression BOB 03

LAND Depression 02

Depression BOB 04

Depression BOB 05

LAND Depression 03

Depression BOB 06

Depression BOB 07

Deep Depression BOB 08

Deep Depression ARB 02

Severe Cyclonic Storm BOB 09

Tropical Storm Three, which formed in the central Bay of Bengal on October 11, hit eastern India on the 16th as a 60 mph tropical storm. It brought considerable damages to Andhra Pradesh and Telangana.

Severe Cyclonic Storm BOB 10
An area of convection south of the previous storm slowly organized into a tropical storm on October 16. It tracked northwestward, reaching a peak of 60 mph winds before hitting southeastern India on the 20th as a weakened 50 mph storm. 60 casualties can be attributed to this system and 400 huts were damaged.

Extremely Severe Cyclonic Storm ARB 03
The final storm of the season developed on November 4 in the central Arabian Sea. It tracked northeastward, strengthening into a tropical storm on the 6th and a cyclone on the 7th. The system peaked at 100 mph winds before hitting Veraval, India on the 8th. The cyclone rapidly dissipated, after resulting in 511 casualties and heavy flooding. Damages in Indian rupees were estimated to be 128 crores.

Deep Depression BOB 11

Deep Depression ARB 04

Depression BOB 12

See also

North Indian Ocean tropical cyclone
1983 Atlantic hurricane season
1983 Pacific hurricane season
1983 Pacific typhoon season
Australian cyclone seasons: 1981–82, 1982–83
South Pacific cyclone seasons: 1981–82, 1982–83
South-West Indian Ocean cyclone seasons: 1981–82, 1982–83

References

External links
India Meteorological Department
Joint Typhoon Warning Center 

 
1982 NIO